A bantam is any small variety of fowl, usually of chicken or duck. Most large chicken breeds and several breeds of duck have a bantam counterpart, which is much smaller than the standard-sized fowl, but otherwise similar in most or all respects. A true bantam chicken is naturally small and has no large counterpart.

Etymology
The word bantam derives  from the name of the seaport city of Bantam in western Java, Indonesia. European sailors restocking on live fowl for sea journeys found the small native breeds of chicken in Southeast Asia to be useful, and any such small poultry came to be known as a bantam.

See also
 List of chicken breeds
 American Bantam Association
 Call duck - bantam breed of duck originally bred to attract wild ducks within the range of hunters with guns, now kept as pets
 Dwarfism in chickens

References

 
 

 
Poultry
Birds of Europe